Princess Sophia Desta (25 November 1934 – 11 November 2021) was the youngest daughter of Ras Desta Damtew and Princess Tenagnework Haile Selassie, and granddaughter of Emperor Haile Selassie I of Ethiopia. She was educated at Clarendon School for Girls in the United Kingdom together with her three sisters, Aida, Hirut Desta (Ruth) and Sebel.  Princess Sophia was imprisoned, mistreated and humiliated in the Alem Bekagn Kerchele prison, Addis Ababa together with her sisters, other princesses of the Imperial Family, from 1974 until 1988.

She was the widow of Captain Dereje Haile Mariam, graduate of the Royal Military Academy Sandhurst in the U.K. She married him at Addis Ababa, on 31 January 1959 (in a double wedding with her sister Princess Seble-Wengel Desta). Captain Dereje Haile Mariam was born in 1937 and he was killed at Addis Ababa, at the Genuete Luel Palace while defending the Emperor against a palace coup d'état carried out by General Mengistu Newaye, head of the Imperial bodyguard on 16 December 1960. They had an only daughter:

  Emebet Hannah Mariam Meherete Sellasie Dereje (born in February 1961, Addis Ababa) and educated at Clarendon School for Girls. She married Lij Aklog Asfaw, son of Woizero Daremelesh and Colonel Asfaw Habte Mariam '  They had issue, one son: 
 Lij Desta Aklog born on October 4, 1994.

Title, style and honours
Title
 1 January 1934 – 11 November 2021:' Her Royal Highness'' Princess Sophia Desta of Ethiopia

Honours

National dynastic honours
  House of Solomon: Knight Grand Cordon with Collar of the Order of the Queen of Sheba
  House of Solomon: Recipient of the Refugee Medal 
  House of Solomon: Recipient of the Silver Anniversary Medal of Emperor Haile Selassie I and Empress Menen 
  House of Solomon: Recipient of the Emperor Haile Selassie I Ruby Jubilee and 75th Birthday Medal

Foreign honours
 : Knight Grand Cross of the Order of Queen Kossomak
 : Knight Grand Cross of the Order of Isabella the Catholic

Ancestry

References 

1934 births
2021 deaths
Sophia Desta
Solomonic dynasty
Haile Selassie
Sophia Desta
People educated at Clarendon School for Girls
Recipients of the Order of Isabella the Catholic
Knights Grand Cross of the Order of Isabella the Catholic
Recipients of orders, decorations, and medals of Ethiopia